James Riordan (10 October 1936 – 11 February 2012) was an English novelist, broadcaster, sports historian, association football player and Russian scholar.

He was well known for his work Sport in Soviet Society, the first academic look at sport in the Soviet Union, and for his children's novels.

He claims to have been the first Briton to play football in the USSR, playing for FC Spartak Moscow in 1963. There are, however, no documents, match reports or eyewitness accounts that support his claim, and many details in the story were inaccurate.

Life and career
Born in Portsmouth in 1936, James Riordan learned to speak Russian during National Service training in the Royal Air Force from 1955 to 1957. In 1960, he graduated in Russian Studies at the University of Birmingham, before qualifying as a teacher at the London Institute of Education.

In 1963, Riordan studied at the Communist higher party school in Moscow; he was an avowed Communist, and was one of the few English students at the school.

His autobiography Comrade Jim: The Spy Who Played for Spartak includes an account of his games for Spartak Moscow; some Russian commentators have questioned these claims.

When he returned to England he became lecturer at Bradford University before moving on to the University of Surrey at Guildford where became head of the Russian Department and was awarded a personal professorship. In 1980, he was the Olympic attache for the British Olympic Association of the 1980 Moscow Olympics. He held an honorary doctorate of Grenoble University and was President (2003-5) and later Fellow of the European Committee for Sports History.

His autobiography, Comrade Jim: The Spy who Played for Spartak, was published in 2008.

His 2008 novel The Sniper tells the story of Soviet sniper Tania Chernova and is based on Riordan's interviews with the subject.

He has also made a study of "The Death Match" — the 1943 non-official association football match between Soviet POWs and soldiers of the Wehrmacht — and has written a scholarly article and a children's novel, Match of Death, on the subject.

Select bibliography

Autobiography
Comrade Jim: The Spy Who Played for Spartak, Harper Perennial, 2009.

Non-fiction
 Sport in Soviet Society: Development of Sport and Physical Education in Russia and the USSR. Cambridge: Cambridge Univ. Press, 1977. (partially Birmingham, Univ., Diss.). .
 Sport in European Cultures (2002)

Children's novels
 Sweet Clarinet (1998)
 When the Guns Fall Silent (2000)
 The Secret Telegram (2001)
 The Prisoner (2001)
 War Song (2001)
 Match of Death (2003)
 The Gift (2004)
 Escape from War (2005)
 Rebel Cargo (2007)
 The Sniper (2008)
 Blood Runner (2011)

Children's anthologies
 Mistress of the Copper Mountain: Folk Tales from the Urals (1974) 
 Tales from Central Russia: Russian Tales (Kestrel, 1976) , Illustrated by Krystyna Turska.
 Tales from Tartar (1979)
 The Woman in the Moon and Other Tales of Forgotten Heroines (Hutchinson,1985) , Illustrated by Angela Barrett.
 Russian Gypsy Tales (1985) 
 An Illustrated Treasury of Fairy and Folk Tales (1986) 
 The Wild Swans (Hutchinson,1987) , Illustrated by Helen Stratton.
 Folk-tales of the British Isles (1987) 
 The Sun Maiden and the Crescent Moon: Siberian Folk Tales (1989)
 The Barefoot Book of Stories from the Sea (Barefoot Books Ltd., 1996) , Illustrated by Amanda Hall.
 King Arthur (1998)
 The Twelve Labours of Hercules (Frances Lincoln,1998) Illustrated by Christina Balit.
 The Storytelling Star: Tales of the Sun, the Moon and the Stars (Pavilion Books Limited, 1999) , Illustrated by Amanda Hall.
 The Young Oxford Book of Football Stories (2000)
 Russian Folk-Tales (Oxford University Press, 2000). , illustrated by Andrew Breakspear.

As editor

 James Riordan (ed.). Sport under Communism. Montreal: McGill-Queen's University Press, 1978. .
  Riordan, James & Arnd Krüger (eds.). The international politics of sport in the twentieth century. London: Routledge, 1999. 
  James Riordan & Arnd Krüger (eds.). European cultures of sport: examining the nations and regions.  Bristol: Intellect, 2003. 
  Arnd Krüger & James Riordan (eds). The story of worker sport. Champaign, Ill.: Human Kinetics (1996). 

As translator
 Chinghiz Aitmatov, Jamilia, Telgram Books: London, 2012
 Anton Chekhov, Boys (short story), Progress Publishers: Moscow, 1979

Literary awards
Riordan's first novel Sweet Clarinet won the NASEN Award, and was shortlisted for the Whitbread Children's Book Award. Match of Death won the South Lanarkshire Book Award. The Gift'' was also shorted for the NASEN Award.

References

External links

 Official biography at University of Worcester
 Biography at publisher Oxford University Press
 Interview by Soccerphile
 European Committee for Sports History
 

1936 births
2012 deaths
Sportspeople from Portsmouth
Alumni of the University of Birmingham
Communist Party of Great Britain members
Sports historians
Academics of the University of Bradford
English male novelists
20th-century English novelists
Academics of the University of Surrey